Traitors is a British television drama miniseries created by Bathsheba Doran and broadcast by Channel 4 and Netflix in 2019. Set in 1945 London after the end of World War Two, Traitors follows a young woman recruited by the American Office of Strategic Services to identify a Soviet spy in the Cabinet Office.

Cast and characters
Emma Appleton as Feef Symonds, a young, naive and intelligent upper-class civil servant in the Cabinet Office, recruited as an agent by the United States Office of Strategic Services (OSS)
Luke Treadaway as Hugh Fenton, a Labour Party Member of Parliament for a constituency in Derbyshire, and Royal Tank Regiment veteran
Michael Stuhlbarg as Thomas Rowe, a senior American agent handler of the OSS 
Keeley Hawes as Priscilla Garrick, a senior civil servant of the Cabinet Office
Brandon P. Bell as Jackson Cole, an American army driver and Rowe's assistant at the OSS 
Matt Lauria as Peter McCormick, an American army soldier and a staff of the OSS  
Greg McHugh as David Hennessey, a civil servant in the Ministry of Housing
Jamie Blackley as Freddie Symonds, Feef's brother, a closeted gay man, and an unsuccessful Conservative Party parliamentary candidate
Danny Sapani as Richard, an American communist living in London
Bijan Daneshmand as Abu Selim, Minister from the Arab League addressing the Cabinet Office

Music 
The series begins and each episode ends, with a recording of the Pete Seeger song "There Is Mean Things Happening in This Land", recorded for the purpose by Graham Coxon.

Episodes

References

External links
 

2019 British television series debuts
2019 British television series endings
2010s British drama television series
2010s British television miniseries
Channel 4 television dramas
English-language television shows
British military television series
Television series set in the 1940s
Television shows set in London
Television series by Warner Bros. Television Studios